In enzymology, a hydrogenobyrinic acid a,c-diamide synthase (glutamine-hydrolysing) is an enzyme that catalyzes the chemical reaction

2 ATP + hydrogenobyrinic acid + 2 L-glutamine + 2 H2O  2 ADP + 2 phosphate + hydrogenobyrinic acid a,c-diamide + 2 L-glutamate

The four substrates of this enzyme are ATP, hydrogenobyrinic acid, L-glutamine, and H2O;  its four products are ADP, phosphate, hydrogenobyrinic acid a,c-diamide, and L-glutamate.

This enzyme belongs to the family of ligases, specifically those forming carbon-nitrogen bonds carbon-nitrogen ligases with glutamine as amido-N-donor.  The systematic name of this enzyme class is hydrogenobyrinic-acid:L-glutamine amido-ligase (AMP-forming). This enzyme is also called CobB and is part of the biosynthetic pathway to cobalamin (vitamin B12) in aerobic bacteria.

See also
 Cobalamin biosynthesis

References

 
 

EC 6.3.5
Enzymes of unknown structure